Jacqueline Mates-Muchin, a San Francisco native, is the first Chinese-American rabbi in the world. Her mother was second-generation Chinese-American and her father was the son of Austrian Jewish immigrants.
She was ordained by Hebrew Union College-Jewish Institute of Religion in New York in 2002. After serving as an assistant rabbi in Buffalo, New York, she joined Temple Sinai in Oakland, California in 2005. She was chosen as the first female senior rabbi of Temple Sinai in January 2015. She has four children, aged twenty, eighteen, fifteen, and twelve, as of January 2022.

See also
Timeline of women rabbis

References

American people of Chinese descent
American people of Austrian-Jewish descent
American Reform rabbis
Living people
Reform women rabbis
Year of birth missing (living people)
21st-century American Jews